Anika Learoyd is an Australian Gumbaynggirr cricketer who plays as a right-handed batter and right-arm leg break bowler.
She was the leading run-scorer in the 2020 Cricket Australia Under-18 National Championships with 384 runs at an average of 42.67. She plays for the Sydney Thunder in the Women's Big Bash League and the New South Wales Breakers in the Women's National Cricket League. She made her debut for the Thunder on 25 October 2020 against the Sydney Sixers but the match was abandoned after the toss. She made her Breakers debut on 25 February 2021 against the Tasmanian Tigers, scoring 9 not out.

References

External links

Anika Learoyd at Cricket Australia

Living people
Indigenous Australian cricketers
Australian women cricketers
New South Wales Breakers cricketers
Sydney Thunder (WBBL) cricketers
Year of birth missing (living people)